Baljvine is a village located in the municipality of Mrkonjić Grad in Bosnia and Herzegovina. It is in the administrative entity Republic of Srpska. According to census estimates in 1991, the village population was 1,140. The population decreased from 973 to 437 people in 2013.

Geography 
Lower Baljvine is located on a plateau above the Vrbas river at an altitude of approximately 495 m. Upper Baljvine is at 566 m. The edge of the village lies on the southeastern slope of Čemernica Mountain. Local roads connect Baljvine to the main roads M-16 and E-661.

History 
There are stećci (tombstones) dating back to the 14th century in the hamlet of Kocelji. In May 2003, the village was declared a cultural monument in Bosnia and Herzegovina. The Bosnian Mosque in the village was the only mosque left intact in the Banja Luka region during the Bosnian War (1992–95).

During World War II, Baljvine was a stop on the supply line for Yugoslav Partisan units operating in Central Bosnia. The route passed through the Vrhovine highlands from Prnjavor via Čečava, Klupe (Borja), Maslovare and Skender Vakuf to Baljvine and from there to the entire Bosanska Krajina region. This route was used by many groups, including the "people's government" and military delegations. It was especially useful for units of the 11th Krajina Division of the Partisans, who used it as a message stop. It was used for transport by packhorse of food and livestock, donated by the people of the župa (district) to aid partisan units and others in Bosanska Krajina. Military supplies for the Partisans and their supporters also flowed in the opposite direction, from Mrkonjić Grad across the Vrbas. The route was used by the League of Communists of Yugoslavia, students on military-political and medical courses, and couriers who delivered reports and messages. The Chetniks had links to the Ustashe and to the Germans who were permitted to operate a radio station and intelligence points in Chetnik territory: all this posed a constant danger to users of this route and to supplies bound for the Divisional hospital.

Population

References

Villages in Republika Srpska
Mrkonjić Grad